There have been 91 gubernatorial elections in the state of New York since 1777, with the most recent being held on November 8, 2022. The next election is scheduled to be held on November 3, 2026.

General information

Originally the term for governor of New York was three years long and began on July 1, the election being held in the last week of April or May 1. In 1817, following the resignation of Daniel D. Tompkins after serving only eight months of his term, there was a new election, since the 1777 Constitution did not give the lieutenant governor the right to succeed to the governor's office, and DeWitt Clinton was elected for a whole three-year-term. The New York State Constitutional Convention of 1821 reduced the term to two years – beginning on January 1 and ending on December 31 – and moved the election to the Tuesday after the first Monday in November. Due to this measure, DeWitt Clinton's own second term was cut short by half a year. Beginning with the election in 1876, the term was increased to three years again, beginning with the election in 1894 reduced to two years, and since the election in 1938 has its present duration of four years.

Although the candidates for lieutenant governor have always run on tickets with the governor's candidates, until the election of 1950 they were elected on separate ballots, so on several occasions (1826, 1846, 1850, 1906, and 1924) the governor and his lieutenant were elected of opposing tickets.

In only 15 of the total 91 elections has the incumbent lost re-election.

The elected candidates are shown in bold face in the tables below.

Recent elections

2022

2018

2014

2010

2006

2002

Older elections

1966-1998
Gubernatorial elections under the State Constitution of 1938. The term is four years.

1998

1994

1990

1986

1982

1978

1974

1970

1966

1938-1962

1962

1958

1954

1950

1946

1942

1938

1894-1936
Gubernatorial elections under the State Constitution of 1894. The term was two years.

Note: This was the last time the running mate of the elected governor was defeated, Democrat Smith having Republican Lowman as lieutenant for the duration of this term.

Notes:
 List of candidates, in NYT on September 13, 1920
 List of candidates, in NYT on October 27, 1920

Notes:
This was the first time women voted for governor of New York, and Alfred E. Smith was the first governor elected with more than 1 million votes.
Election result in NYT on December 31, 1918

Note: William Sulzer had been elected governor as a Democrat at the previous election, but was impeached. Martin Glynn had been elected Lt. Gov and succeeded to the governorship upon Sulzer's impeachment.

Note: election result, in NYT on December 16, 1910

Note: The majority faction of the Democratic Party were then known as "Silver Democrats", and the "National Democrats" were the "Gold Democrats".

Notes:
Wheeler was nominated by the "Democratic Reform Association of Brooklyn" who were opposed to the regular Democrats led by Hugh McLaughlin.
Election result in NYT on December 15, 1894

1876-1891
Gubernatorial elections under the State Constitution of 1846, amended in 1874. The term was three years.

The tickets:  in NYT on November 3, 1879

The tickets:  in NYT on November 2, 1876
The Greenback convention:  in NYT on September 27, 1876

1847-1874
Gubernatorial elections under the State Constitution of 1846. The term was two years.

The tickets:  in NYT on October 30, 1870

Note: John T. Hoffman was a Democrat, Robert H. Pruyn a Republican. The "Conservative Union" ticket was nominated by the Democrats in an attempt to attract Republicans, especially Democrats who had joined the Republican Union and remained Republicans after the Civil War, to return to the Democratic Party.

Note:
Horatio Seymour was the candidate of the Democratic Party that wanted to end the war.
James Wadsworth was a Republican, Lyman Tremain a pre-war Democrat, nominated by the Republican Union in which the Republican Party was joined by the War Democrats who supported Lincoln and the Union.
The total of ballots cast were more than 70,000 less than in the previous election because the soldiers in the field were not allowed to vote.

Note:
William Kelly was the candidate of the majority faction of the Democratic Party which supported Stephen A. Douglas for President.
James T. Brady was a member of Tammany Hall, nominated by the minority faction of the Democratic Party which supported John C. Breckinridge for President.

Notes:
Result:  Official State Canvass in NYT on December 21, 1854 (William Goodell's votes were counted among the "scattering votes").
Myron H. Clark won this election with the lowest percentage ever in NY Gov. elections, nominated by the Whigs (of which party he was a member), and endorsed by the Anti-Nebraska Party (which merged in 1855 with the Whigs to form the Republican Party), the Anti-Rent Party, the "Free Democrats" (the remnants of the Free-Soil Party with radical anti-slavery Democrats), and the supporters of Temperance.
The "Soft" or "Soft-shell" candidate was the choice of the majority faction of the Democratic Party.
The American Party was called "Know Nothing" in contemporaneous newspapers.
The "National Democracy" (a faction of the Democratic Party) were called "Hards" or "Hard-shells" by contemporaneous newspapers.
Liberty Party convention  in NYT on September 29, 1854

Note:
 At the first judicial election under the Constitution of 1846, Addison Gardiner was elected in June 1847 to the Court of Appeals, to take office on July 1, 1847. To fill the vacancy, on September 27, a special election was scheduled by the State Legislature to be held at the annual state election.
 Result Manual of the Corporation of the City of New York (1852)

1822-1846
Gubernatorial elections under the State Constitution of 1821. The term was two years. Until 1840, elections were held during three days beginning on the first Monday in November. Since 1841, until today, all regular elections have been held on the Tuesday after the first Monday in November. The elected candidate takes office on January 1 of the following calendar year.

Result Manual of the Corporation of the City of New York 1852)

Result Manual of the Corporation of the City of New York 1852) (giving wrong number of votes for Smith, "2496" is a typo)
see also The History of the Loco-foco, Or Equal Rights Party: Its Movements, Conventions and Proceedings by Fitzwilliam Byrdsall (Clement & Packard, 1842)

Result: The New Annual Register, Or General Repository of History, Politics, and Literature, for the Year 1823 by Andrew Kippis, William Godwin, George Robinson, G. G. and J. Robinson (Paternoster Row, London, England, 1824)

1777-1820
Gubernatorial elections under the State Constitution of 1777. The term was three years, the election held in the last week of April or on May 1.

Note:
Tompkins was the sitting US Vice President.
DeWitt Clinton was legislated out of office on December 31, 1822.

Note: Governor Tompkins was elected US Vice President in November 1816, and he resigned in February 1817. Article XVII of the New York State Constitution of 1777 said that "...as often as the seat of government shall become vacant, a wise and descreet freeholder of this State shall be, by ballot, elected governor,... which elections shall be always held at the times and places of choosing representatives in assembly..." This meant that, whenever a vacancy occurred, the Lt. Gov. did not succeed to the governor's office but administrated the state only until the end of the yearly term of the New York State Assembly on June 30, the successor being elected in April.

Note: Lt. Gov. Broome died in August 1810, and the 1777 Constitution provided for new elections if a vacancy occurred either in the Governor's or the Lieutenant Governor's office. See 1817 general election.

Note: Aaron Burr was the sitting US Vice President.

Note: John Jay received more votes than George Clinton, but on technicalities the votes of Otsego, Tioga and Clinton counties were disqualified and not counted, giving Clinton a slight majority. Under the Constitution of 1777, the votes were canvassed by a joint committee of the state legislature, six members each from the assembly and the senate. The members were David Gelston, Thomas Tillotson, Melancton Smith, David Graham, Pierre Van Cortlandt, Jr., David McCarty, Jonathan N. Havens, Samuel Jones, Isaac Roosevelt, Leonard Gansevoort, and Joshua Sands. The state constitution said that the cast votes shall be delivered to the secretary of state "by the sheriff or his deputy". The ballots from Otsego County were forwarded to the secretary of state by Sheriff Smith who was holding over in office until the appointment of a successor after his term had expired. The ballot box from Clinton County was delivered to the secretary of state's office by a person without deputation who had received the box from the sheriff. The ballot box from Tioga County was delivered to the secretary of state by the clerk of the special deputy appointed by the sheriff. The canvass committee disagreed on whether to allow these ballots to be counted. The question was referred to the U.S. Senators from New York, Federalist Rufus King and Dem.-Rep. Aaron Burr, for arbitration. King said all votes ought to be canvassed. Burr said that the ballots from Clinton County ought to be allowed, and the ones from Otsego and Tioga Counties should be rejected. Thereupon, a majority of the canvass committee (Gelston, Tillotson, Smith, Graham, Van Cortlandt, McCarty, and Havens) rejected the ballots from all three counties and declared George Clinton duly elected governor by a majority of 108 votes. The minority (Jones, Roosevelt, Gansevoort, and Sands) protested in writing. In Otsego County, John Jay had a majority of about 400, and discounting the small majorities for Clinton in Tioga and Clinton Counties, would have won the election. Clinton was accused by the Federalists of usurpation and the canvass committee of having made a partisan decision against the wishes of the electorate.

Note: Clinton and Van Cortlandt were re-elected unopposed.

Note: Clinton and Van Cortlandt were re-elected unopposed.

Notes:
The election began on June 1, but due to the Revolutionary War it took some time to collect and count the votes, and the official result was announced on July 9. George Clinton accepted the office of Governor on July 11 and assumed its duties immediately, pending taking the oath as soon as he could safely leave his military command.
There were no parties yet; the Democratic-Republican and Federalist Parties appeared only in 1789, and until then the candidacies were personal. Besides, the candidates for Governor and Lieutenant Governor were not "running mates"; all candidates were voted for independently.
The Committee of Safety (the governing body of the State of New York after the Constitutional Convention adjourned) endorsed Philip Schuyler for Governor and George Clinton for Lieutenant Governor, which led to Clinton's receiving votes for both offices and actually winning both. Clinton formally resigned the lieutenant governorship and Pierre Van Cortlandt was elected lieutenant governor in a special election in 1778.

See also
 New York Attorney General elections
 New York Comptroller elections
 New York state elections

Notes

References

Further reading
Paterson, David "Black, Blind, & In Charge: A Story of Visionary Leadership and Overcoming Adversity." Skyhorse Publishing. New York, New York, 2020

Sources
New York Governor elections
New York Governor candidates
New York Lieutenant Governor candidates

Quadrennial elections
Elections